Clive William Bunker (born 30 December 1946) is a British drummer.  Bunker is best known as the original drummer of the rock band  Jethro Tull, playing in the band from 1967 until 1971. Never a self-professed technical drummer, Bunker engaged with the essence of blues and rock and roll, influenced by Ginger Baker and Mitch Mitchell. He was also inspired by Buddy Rich and The Hollies' Bobby Elliott.

Early career
Bunker was born in Luton, Bedfordshire, and played in his first band The Warriors in the 1960s. With Mick Abrahams he later formed the band known as McGregor's Engine. In this early career, playing in small venues, Bunker had an extraordinary non-matching drum kit, composed of bits and pieces of various manufacturers’ equipment.

Jethro Tull
Between 1967 and 1971 he drummed for Jethro Tull. But he left after the band released its most popular album to that date, Aqualung, to get married and spend more time with his new wife. He was replaced by Barriemore Barlow, a school friend of the group's singer/songwriter Ian Anderson.  Bunker said about his decision to leave Jethro Tull while its success was growing:

"I had always told Ian, 'If I find the right lady, I'll be gone,' and I did just that. That was just at the start of their world touring in '72, and I wouldn't have been back in England for ages at a time. So I thought that I might as well end it then. Besides, Barrie was always in the background anyway, so I knew I wasn't going to put them in a difficult situation. You must understand that back then, we didn't have any time off; it was non-stop work, and I wanted to spend time with my wife."

Later career
After Jethro Tull, Bunker recorded and performed as a session musician with a variety of acts, including Blodwyn Pig, Robin Trower, Jude, Steve Howe, Jeff Pain (aka Dicken, formerly of the UK band Mr Big), Manfred Mann's Earth Band, Jack Bruce, Gordon Giltrap, Anna Ryder, Uli Jon Roth, Electric Sun, Steve Hillage, Vikki Clayton, Solstice, Glenn Hughes and Jerry Donahue.

He was a session musician on Generation X's second LP Valley of the Dolls (1979).

Aviator
In 1978 Bunker founded the band Aviator with Jack Lancaster, a former Blodwyn Pig bandmate, later releasing two LP's, Aviator (1979), and Turbulence (1980).

Solo works
Bunker's debut solo album, entitled Awakening, was released in 1998.

Discography

Solo
 Awakening (1998) – With Ian Anderson and Martin Barre.

With Jethro Tull
 This Was (1968)
Stand Up (1969)
Benefit (1970)
Aqualung (1971)
Living in the Past (1972)

With Steve Howe
 The Steve Howe Album – Plays percussions on Cactus Boogie

With Generation X
 Valley of the dolls – Guest musician

With Aviator
 Aviator (1979)
 Turbulence (1980)

Steve Hillage 
 1976 : BBC Old Grey Whistle Test 2/11/76 "Hurdy Gurdy Glissando". 
 1979 : Live Herald : He played drums on the tracks "Salmon Song", "The Dervish Riff", "Castles In The Clouds" and "Hurdy Gurdy Man" These tracks were recorded on the gig which was played on 26 March 1977 in the Rainbow Theatre London.
 2007 : Green : On the 2007 reedited version, Clive plays drums on one song recorded live at The Rainbow in 1977 : "Not Fade Away (Glid Forever).

With Electric Sun Uli Jon Roth
 Beyond the Astral Skies (1985)

With Blodwyn Pig
 Lies (1994)
 Pig in the Middle (1996)
 Live At The Lafayette (1997)
 The Basement Tapes (2000)
 Live At The Marquee Club London 1974 (2002) 
 All Said And Done (2011)
 Pigthology (2013)

With Manfred Mann's Earth Band
 Soft Vengeance (1996)

With Solstice
 Circles (1997)
 The Cropredy Set (2002)

With Beggar's Farm
 Diving in the Past (2005) – With ex-PFM and Acqua Fragile Italian singer Bernardo Lanzetti on vocals. 
 Itullians (2007) – With ex-Jethro Tull members Mick Abrahams on guitar, Jonathan Noyce on bass and Bernardo Lanzetti on vocals.

References

External links
 [ Clive Bunker biography at Allmusic]
 
 Clive Bunker on Manfred Mann's Earth Band
 Clive Bunker on www.collecting-tull.com

1946 births
Living people
English rock drummers
Jethro Tull (band) members
Manfred Mann's Earth Band members
People from Luton
Progressive rock drummers